Moksha is a river in central Russia, a right tributary of the Oka. It flows through Penza Oblast, Nizhny Novgorod Oblast, Ryazan Oblast and the Republic of Mordovia, and joins the Oka near Pyatnitsky Yar, near the city of Kasimov.

In the 1950s, several hydroelectric power stations were built in the middle course of the river, but without navigable locks. In 1955, 2 km below the mouth of the river. Prices on the Moksha River built Rasypukhinsky hydro-power plant with a hydroelectric power station and a wooden shipping lock. Navigation on the river was carried out until the mid-1990s.

On the Moksha is the Trinity-Scans monastery, the Nativity-Theotokos Sanaksar Monastery and the Krasnoslobodsky Savior-Transfiguration Monastery.

Origin of name and cultural significance 
Although Russian lands with its origins of i.a Slavic, Uralic and Turkic people were in its history a space were Russia developed isolated for a long time and unknown to the eastern, northern, western and southern neighbors, it was a cultural space which in other phases of history was used for interaction from peoples, cultures and tribes from different continents. Russia, Russian culture and its people became somewhat known for its neighbors in the middle and towards the end of 1st millennium AD. During this period in first sources, the terms of Russia, Russkiye appeared.

The name is connected to the ancient Indo-European population of the Pohje, speaking a language close to the Baltic. Hydronym is comparable with the Indo-European basis meksha, meaning "spillage, leakage". It is suggested that in the language of Indo-European aborigines moksha meant "stream, current, river" and as a term entered into a series of hydronyms (Shirmksha, Mamoksha, etc.).

The name "Moksha" is mentioned by the monk-minorite Rubruk, the ambassador of the French King Louis IX to the Mongolian khan Sartak (1253).

Sources
In the monograph "The Nature of the Penza Region" it is pointed out that p. Moksha originates from above. Lookout Nechaevsky (now Mokshan district) of the Penza region. According to the latest information, Moksha begins in a ravine from the springs system near the village of Elizavetino. The source of Moksha is on a treeless place. Research conducted in 2009-2010. Showed that from the south with. This site is called "Dry Moksha". The constant flow of water is observed below the confluence of the hollow from the holy spring, where a small extension of the channel also forms. A true watercourse flows towards Vision in a poorly developed channel. In some places, the banks collapse in the face of the knocking out of them groundwater flowing into the channel. The bottom of the lowland where the stream flows is swamped. Along the banks of the stream, shrubs of willows, thickets of broadleaf cattails, reeds of forest and some other moisture-loving plants grow in the water. Thus, the source of Moksha is a drying creek, now fueled by thawed and groundwater. It stretches to c. The look gradually turning into a constant stream.

Tributaries
The Moksha has the following tributaries, from mouth to source:

49 km: Yezhachka
51 km: Tsna
82 km: Urzeva (Chyornaya Rechka)
105 km: Vad
121 km: Yermish
135 km: Shoksha
144 km: Yuzga
150 km: Vyazhka
160 km: Vedyazha
170 km: Varnava
177 km: Uzhovka
183 km: Sarma
191 km: Satis
231 km: Lomovka
248 km: Bolshoy Aksel
258 km: Urey (Ureyka)
266 km: Shavits (Varskley)
294 km: Nuluy
295 km: Urkat
302 km: Sukhoy Urey
310 km: Varma
338 km: Sivin
346 km: Shapa
351 km: Gumenka
360 km: Ryabka
373 km: Linyevka
388 km: Bolshaya Azyas
412 km: Sezelka
418 km: Mokshan
420 km: Lashma
432 km: Unuy
437 km: Issa
464 km: Panzha
477 km: Sheldais
492 km: Kamora
497 km: Kaurets
500 km: Modayev
532 km: Lomovka
540 km: Atmiss
545 km: Iva
553 km: Kerka
562 km: Losma (near the village Gorlitsyno)
563 km: Vyunka
586 km: Medayevka (Madayevka)
596 km: Muromka (Shirkoiss)
599 km: Skachki
604 km: Yulovka
620 km: Azyas
624 km: Saranka

References

Rivers of Ryazan Oblast
Rivers of Nizhny Novgorod Oblast
Rivers of Penza Oblast
Rivers of Mordovia